Prosvjeta ("Enlightenment/Education") or the Serbian Cultural-Educational Society "Prosvjeta" was a Bosnian Serb cultural and educational society in Austro-Hungarian Bosnia and Herzegovina and Yugoslavia. It was founded in Sarajevo in 1902. It quickly became the most important organization gathering ethnic Serb citizens.

In 1909 the first and the only student's house of Prosvjeta was opened in Mostar and Božidar Zečević was its first prefect.

In 1914, the Austro-Hungarian regime had the organization banned and its leadership imprisoned due to "anti-state" actions.

Notable people
Petar Kočić
Aleksa Šantić
Jovan Dučić
Pero Slijepčević
Grigorije Petrov
Jovan Cvijić

See also
Gajret
Napredak (1904)

References

Sources 

Serb organizations
1902 establishments in Austria-Hungary
Serbs of Bosnia and Herzegovina
Austro-Hungarian Serbs
Educational institutions established in 1902
Organizations disestablished in 1914
Cultural organizations based in Bosnia and Herzegovina
Ethnic organizations based in Austria-Hungary